Chetvertynivka is a Ukrainian village in the Haisyn Raion (district) of Vinnytsia Oblast (province).

References 

Villages in Haisyn Raion